ClipGrab is a donationware video download manager, allowing the download of videos from a variety of websites such as YouTube, Vimeo, Dailymotion or Facebook.
It has been praised for its user-friendliness, but also flagged as malware by security software. It can convert the downloaded files to other file formats such as MP3, MPEG4, OGG Theora or WMV. It is published as free software under the terms of the GPL-3.0-or-later license. It is developed and maintained by Philipp Schmieder Medien of vanbittern.com.

Features 
ClipGrab officially supports the download from a handful of video websites which include YouTube, Dailymotion, Vimeo, and Facebook. In addition to this, the software provides a heuristic which can also download videos from sites that are not officially supported. When available, ClipGrab offers different quality options for a video. With this feature, the user can choose between downloading a high definition, standard definition or low definition version of the video.
ClipGrab can automatically detect compatible URLs when they are copied to the clipboard. The program provides an integrated search function for YouTube. It also lets the user convert the downloaded files to other file formats such as MP3, MPEG4, OGG Theora or WMV.
It has especially been praised for its clean and easy-to-use user interface. Software review site softoxi.com states that "[ClipGrab] has a beautifully designed graphical user interface" and "stands out immediately for its look, feel and performance"

License 
ClipGrab is published as free software under the GPL-3.0-or-later license

Unusually for an open source project, file checksums, code repositories, developer documentation, or online issue trackers are not publicly available. Until 2015, ClipGrab published an online source code repository including a GPL open source license. The software's website elicits donations from end users, making it a type of donationware.

Development 
ClipGrab was originally developed in the proprietary programming language PureBasic, and could only download one video at a time. Later, the software was rewritten using C++ and the Qt framework and published under the terms of the GPL-3.0-or-later license. Since version 3.0, the program is also available for macOS.

Criticism 

The ClipGrab installer for Windows includes installCore, an advertising software module classified as a potentially unwanted program (PUP) or potentially unwanted application (PUA) by some anti-malware products. Due to the use of installCore, ClipGrab has been described as "loaded with crapware". Virus reports on the ClipGrab forum have not received a response from the developer. Articles on ClipGrab from 2018 onwards are more critical, and classify the software as malware, rather than as a helpful consumer product, as in reviews from 2011 to 2015.

An alternate download without InstallCore is also offered.

See also 
 Comparison of YouTube downloaders

References

External links 
 

Free software
Multimedia software
Download managers
Software that uses Qt